Scorpaenopsis ramaraoi, Rama Rao's scorpionfish, is a species of venomous marine ray-finned fish belonging to the family Scorpaenidae, the scorpionfishes. This species is found in the Indo-West Pacific all the way from  Pakistan  and Sri Lanka to New Britain to Papua New Guinea.

Etymology
The fish is named in honor of the late Kaza V. Rama Rao who assisted the authors in the early research on Scorpaenopsis.

Size

References

ramaraoi
Taxa named by John Ernest Randall
Taxa named by William N. Eschmeyer
Fish described in 2002